Maki Nishiyama (西山茉希, Nishiyama Maki; born November 16, 1985) is a Japanese model, and actress. Her best-known modeling work has been with the Japanese fashion magazine, CanCam.

Career
In 2005, Nishiyama started her career as a model for the Japanese fashion magazine CanCam under an exclusive contract. She has also appeared in television advertisements for several companies, from Nivea-Kao in 2006 to McDonald's Japan in 2009.  She played a role in a TV drama, Moon lovers (Tsuki no koibito) in 2010.   She played the role of Nabiki Tendo in the Ranma ½ live-action special aired in December 2011.

Television

References

Living people
1985 births
Japanese actresses
Japanese female models
Japanese television personalities